Straight??!! is the fifth studio album by English rock band The Dogs D'Amour. Album was released in 1990 and entered the UK Albums Chart at #32.

Notably, this album is the last Dogs D'Amour recording to feature the 'classic' line-up of Tyla, Steve James, Jo Dog and Bam, as the band would break up onstage in 1991. The album spawned three singles; "Victims of Success", "Empty World" and "Back on the Juice", all of which reached the top 100 of the UK Singles Chart, the first of which was a Top 40 hit.

Track listing
All songs written by Tyla, except where noted.
 "Cardboard Town" - 3:14
 "Kiss My Heart Goodbye" 4:15
 "Lie in This Land" - 3:08
 "You Can't Burn the Devil" - 3:23
 "No Gypsy Blood" - 2:22
 "Empty World" - 2:29
 "Back on the Juice" - 3:52
 "Evil" - 3:26
 "Victims of Success" - 3:10
 "Flyin' Solo" - 4:13
 "Heroine" - 4:43
 "Chiva" - 5:00
 "Lady Nicotine" - 2:52

Japanese CD bonus tracks
 "I Don't Want You to Go" (live bonus) - 5:39
 "Ballad of Jack" (live bonus) (Tyla/Ross) - 3:49

Band
Tyla - vocals, guitar
Jo "Dog" Almeida - guitars
Steve James - bass
Bam - drums

Singles
 "Victims of Success" (1990) UK #36
 "Empty World" (1990) UK #61
 "Back on the Juice" (1990) UK #97

References

1990 albums
The Dogs D'Amour albums